David Rochela Calvo (born 19 February 1990) is a Spanish professional footballer who plays for Thai club Port as a central defender.

Formed at Deportivo La Coruña, he made 18 appearances including in La Liga and the Segunda División, also representing Racing de Santander in the latter. He spent most of his career in the Thai League 1, winning honours at Buriram United and Port.

Club career

Deportivo
Born in As Pontes de García Rodríguez, Galicia, Rochela began his career at local Deportivo de La Coruña, initially for the reserve team in the Segunda División B. He was one of several new faces called up by first-team manager Miguel Ángel Lotina for a Copa del Rey quarter-final second leg on 27 January 2010 against Sevilla FC, who had won the first match 3–0; he debuted as a 70th-minute substitute for Juca in an inconsequential 1–0 away victory.

Rochela made his La Liga bow on 24 April 2010, as a half-time replacement for the injured Piscu in a 1–0 loss at Valencia CF. He then started the next three games in the closing stages of the season.

Rochela barely played in the next two years, as Deportivo were relegated and then promoted as champions of Segunda División. On 20 July 2012, with three years remaining on his Depor contract, he was loaned to newly-relegated Racing de Santander. He spent the second half of that campaign in his first foreign experience, at Hapoel Tel Aviv F.C. in the Israeli Premier League.

Thailand
Rochela moved to Thai Premier League champions Buriram United F.C. where he won the Kor Royal Cup in February 2014 with a 1–0 win over Muangthong United FC. On 2 November that year, he scored a penalty in a 2–1 home defeat of Police United F.C. to retain the title.

On 9 July 2021, Rochela scored again from the spot in a 5–1 Port F.C. victory at Guangzhou F.C. in the group stage of the AFC Champions League. It was his first goal in a continental competition.

International career
Rochela was part of the Spain squad at the 2007 UEFA European Under-17 Championship, winning the tournament in Belgium. The same year, they finished second at the FIFA World Cup held in South Korea.

Club statistics

Honours
Deportivo
Segunda División: 2011–12

Buriram United
Thai Premier League: 2014
Kor Royal Cup: 2014

Port
Thai FA Cup: 2019

Spain U17
UEFA European Under-17 Championship: 2007
FIFA U-17 World Cup runner-up: 2007

References

External links
Deportivo official profile 

1990 births
Living people
Spanish footballers
Footballers from As Pontes de García Rodríguez
Association football defenders
La Liga players
Segunda División players
Segunda División B players
Tercera División players
Deportivo Fabril players
Deportivo de La Coruña players
Racing de Santander players
Israeli Premier League players
Hapoel Tel Aviv F.C. players
David Rochela
David Rochela
David Rochela
Spain youth international footballers
Spanish expatriate footballers
Expatriate footballers in Israel
Expatriate footballers in Thailand
Spanish expatriate sportspeople in Israel
Spanish expatriate sportspeople in Thailand